The Colorado Foxes were a professional soccer team, based in Commerce City, Colorado, that played in the American Professional Soccer League, and later in the A-League, between 1990 and 1997. The Foxes won two APSL titles, in 1992 and 1993. In 1992 they won the regular season as well as the Professional Cup, giving them a minor treble.

The Foxes defeated English Premier League side Norwich City F.C. 3–2 in a Four Nations Cup exhibition match on July 18, 1993, placing third in the tournament. They had previously lost to 1. FC Kaiserslautern of Germany.

When Major League Soccer started and the Colorado Rapids became the region's premier team, the Foxes tried to stay afloat for two years, before relocating, becoming the San Diego Flash. Players that played for the Foxes and then went on to play in MLS include Marcelo Balboa, Robin Fraser, Brian Haynes, Chad Ashton, Tom Soehn, Ted Eck, Scott Benedetti, and Mark Dodd.

Year-by-year

References 

F
Defunct soccer clubs in Colorado
American Professional Soccer League teams
Commerce City, Colorado
A-League (1995–2004) teams
Soccer clubs in Colorado
1990 establishments in Colorado
1997 disestablishments in Colorado
Association football clubs established in 1990
Association football clubs disestablished in 1997